Edith Piaf may refer to:

People 
 Édith Piaf (1915–1963), French singer

Entertainment 
 Edith Piaf (1953 album), album by Edith Piaf
 Édith Piaf (Said It Better Than Me), a 2017 song by Sparks off the album Hippopotamus

Others 
 Musée Édith Piaf, the museum covering Edith Piaf

See also

 
 Piaf (disambiguation)
 Edith